Nirut Sirichanya (born 2 May 1947) is a Thai movie and television actor. He is best known internationally for his role as Lauren's father Fong in the 2011 sequel The Hangover Part II. He is the recipient of Suphannahong National Film Awards for Best Supporting Actor.

Early life
Nirut was born on 2 May 1947. He attended Assumption College in Bangkok and received a graduate certificate in Business Administration in Australia. He then went to Kuala Lumpur to study. When he graduated with a Bachelor of Science degree, he started working at AM PAC as an engineer, before moving to positions in various airline companies, including Alitalia.

Career
Nirut began his acting career at the suggestion of Terng Stiphuang. His first TV series was Sangsoon, in which he co-starred. He then starred in Kae Kop Fah (Just Horizon), shown on Channel 3. By now known throughout Thailand, he attracted the most attention for his part  as Jaded in Poo Cha Na Sib Tid.

His first film was Derby, and he continues to perform to this day. He gained international attention from his role in The Hangover Part II.

Nirut also appeared as a judge in the first season of Thailand's Got Talent.

Television

Filmography

List of awards and nominations received by Nirut Sirichanya

References

External links

Living people
1947 births
Nirut Sirijanya
Nirut Sirijanya